Xavier Technical College is a private Catholic pre-school, primary and secondary school, located in Trinity, Asunción, Paraguay. The co-educational school was established by the Society of Jesus in 1970.

Overview 
Xavier Technical College opened in Asuncion in March 1970. Mornings saw primary school with initially 20 students in three grades, afternoons high school with 70 students, and evenings six professional courses with about 90 students enrolled.

The College has since grown to include more than nine hundred students.

See also

 Catholic Church in Paraguay
 Education in Paraguay
 List of Jesuit schools

References  

Jesuit secondary schools in Paraguay
Jesuit primary schools in Paraguay
1970 establishments in Paraguay
Educational institutions established in 1970
Schools in Asunción